NGC 200 is a spiral galaxy located in the constellation Pisces. It was discovered on December 25, 1790 by William Herschel.

See also 
 Spiral galaxy 
 List of NGC objects (1–1000)
 Pisces (constellation)

References

External links 
 
 
 SEDS

0200
2387
Barred spiral galaxies
Pisces (constellation)
Astronomical objects discovered in 1790
Discoveries by William Herschel